Plesiophrictus is a genus of tarantulas that was first described by Reginald Innes Pocock in 1899.

Species
 it contains eight species, found in Sri Lanka, India, and Micronesia:
Plesiophrictus fabrei (Simon, 1892) – India
Plesiophrictus linteatus (Simon, 1891) – India
Plesiophrictus meghalayaensis Tikader, 1977 – India
Plesiophrictus millardi Pocock, 1899 (type) – India
Plesiophrictus nilagiriensis Siliwal, Molur & Raven, 2007 – India
Plesiophrictus senffti (Strand, 1907) – Micronesia
Plesiophrictus sericeus Pocock, 1900 – India
Plesiophrictus tenuipes Pocock, 1899 – Sri Lanka

Formerly included:
P. bhori Gravely, 1915 (Transferred to Heterophrictus)
P. blatteri Gravely, 1935 (Transferred to Heterophrictus)
P. collinus Pocock, 1899 (Transferred to Sahydroaraneus)
P. guangxiensis Yin & Tan, 2000 (Transferred to Chilobrachys)
P. madraspatanus Gravely, 1935 (Transferred to Neoheterophrictus)
P. mahabaleshwari Tikader, 1977 (Transferred to Heterophrictus)
P. milleti (Pocock, 1900) (Transferred to Heterophrictus)
P. raja Gravely, 1915 (Transferred to Sahydroaraneus)

See also
 List of Theraphosidae species

References

Theraphosidae genera
Spiders of Asia
Taxa named by R. I. Pocock
Theraphosidae